Vladimir Ponomaryov may refer to:
Vladimir Alekseyevich Ponomaryov (born 1940), Soviet international footballer
Vladimir Sergeyevich Ponomaryov (born 1987), Russian footballer
Vladimir Ponomaryov (actor), see Qumi-Qumi
Vladimir Ponomaryov (runner) (born 1952), Soviet Olympic middle-distance runner